The Best of Steve Harley and Cockney Rebel is a compilation album by Steve Harley & Cockney Rebel, which was released in 1980. It features material from the original line-up of Cockney Rebel, the Steve Harley & Cockney Rebel line-up, and two tracks from Harley's solo career.

Background
Following the disappointing sales of his second solo album The Candidate in 1979, EMI Records dropped Harley from their label. A year later, EMI decided to release a compilation album of Steve Harley & Cockney Rebel's work. The compilation producer Colin Miles was selected to compile the album, and The Best of Steve Harley and Cockney Rebel was released in September 1980. It was the band's first compilation to be released in the UK.

The compilation features twelve tracks spanning from 1973 to 1978. Six are Cockney Rebel tracks from 1973–74, four are Steve Harley & Cockney Rebel tracks from 1975–76, and two are from Harley's solo career, which were 1974's "Big Big Deal" and 1978's "Riding the Waves (For Virginia Woolf)". Of the chosen inclusions, "Cavaliers" and "Riding the Waves (For Virginia Woolf)" were never released as singles.

In effort to promote the compilation, EMI re-issued the band's 1975 UK number one hit "Make Me Smile (Come Up and See Me)". It was released as a 7" vinyl single on 3 October 1980. The chosen B-Side was the band's 1973 European hit "Sebastian". The single came with a full picture sleeve, which featured the same photographs of Cockney Rebel, on both the front and back of the sleeve, as would appear on the sleeve of the compilation album. Like the album, the single did not make a chart appearance in the UK.

After the release of the compilation, Harley and a new line-up of Cockney Rebel embarked on a UK Christmas tour. During this tour, Harley introduced three new songs; "Warm My Cold Heart", "I Can Be Anyone" and "Such is Life", as well as a reggae-version of "Mr. Soft".

Release
The album was released by EMI on vinyl and cassette in the UK, the Netherlands, Germany, Portugal, and Australia. The front cover features a photograph of the original Cockney Rebel line-up, while the back sleeve features a photograph of the Steve Harley & Cockney Rebel line-up. Both photographs were taken by Mick Rock. The back sleeve biography and overview was written in 1980 by Chris Welch.

In May 1982, the compilation was re-issued in the UK on the Fame label, as a budget price re-issue. This edition featured the same track-listing and sleeve design.

Critical reception

On its release, Mike Nicholls of Record Mirror felt the compilation "well lives up to its name". He wrote, "Present and correct are [the] singles and early epics 'Sebastian' and 'Tumbling Down', and another half dozen album cuts which kept the flag of style and individuality flying throughout the predominantly barren early seventies." James Belsey of the Bristol Evening Post stated, "This well-chosen compilation - good liner notes too - shows the enduring quality of cuts like 'Make Me Smile', 'Judy Teen', 'Mr Raffles' and the classic 'Sebastian'." Alan Burgess of the Hull Daily Mail described Harley as one of the "most essential pop stars of the early 1970s" and felt that "today Cockney Rebel's music still stands tall". He commented, "'Make Me Smile' is a classic pop tune, and 'Mr. Soft' and 'Psychomodo' illustrate a unique and original rhythmic jerk crowned by Harley's highly derivative, but unmistakable warble."

Track listing
All songs written and composed by Steve Harley, except "Here Comes the Sun" composed by George Harrison.

Personnel
 Steve Harley - vocals (all tracks), producer (tracks 1-6, 8-12)
 Alan Parsons - producer (tracks 1, 3-6, 11-12)
 Neil Harrison - producer (tracks 7)
 Jean Paul-Crocker - electric violin, guitar (tracks 3-7, 12)
 Milton Reame-James - keyboards (tracks 3-7, 12)
 Paul Jeffreys - Fender bass (tracks 3-7, 12)
 Jim Cregan - guitar (tracks 1, 8, 10-11)
 Duncan MacKay - keyboards (tracks 1, 8, 10-11), electric piano/synthesizer (track 9)
 George Ford - bass (tracks 1, 8, 10-11)
 Stuart Elliott - drums, percussion (tracks 1-8, 10-12)
 Lindsay Elliott - percussion (tracks 1, 3-8, 10-12)
 Jo Partridge - acoustic guitar (track 9), electric lead solo (track 9)
 Greg Poree - electric guitar (track 9)
 Bill Payne - acoustic piano (track 9)
 Bob Glaub - bass (track 9)
 Rick Shlosser - drums (track 9)
 Bill Champlin, Bobby Kimball, Tommy Kelly - backing vocals (track 9)
 Harry Moss - cutting engineer
 Adam Yeldham - design and artwork
 Colin Miles - Sleeve Concept
 Mick Rock - photography

References

1980 compilation albums
1982 compilation albums
EMI Records compilation albums